This article is a list of diseases of barley (Hordeum vulgare).

Bacterial and fungal diseases

Nematodes, parasitic

Virus, viroid and virus-like diseases

Phytoplasma diseases

Miscellaneous diseases and disorders

Sources
 Barley Diseases, Queensland Government, Australia
 EPPO Standards, Guidelines on good plant protection - Barley, Europe
 Barley Disease Handbook, NDSU, US
 Barley Disease Index, TAMU, US
 Common Names of Diseases, The American Phytopathological Society, US
 USDA ARS Fungal Database

References

 Common Names of Diseases, The American Phytopathological Society

Barley